Petr Luxa and Radek Štěpánek were the defending champions but only Štěpánek competed that year with Martin Damm.

Damm and Štěpánek lost in the semifinals to Jared Palmer and Pavel Vízner.

Palmer and Vízner won in the final 6–4, 6–4 against Daniele Bracciali and Giorgio Galimberti.

Seeds

  Paul Hanley /  Robbie Koenig (first round)
  Jared Palmer /  Pavel Vízner (champions)
  Jonathan Erlich /  Andy Ram (semifinals)
  Sargis Sargsian /  Nenad Zimonjić (first round)

Draw

References
 2004 Indesit ATP Milan Indoor Doubles Draw

Milan Indoor
2004 ATP Tour
Milan
2004 Milan Indoor